Makardhwaja (or Magardhwaja) is the son of Hindu god Hanuman who is born out of his sweat. Makardhwaja has appearance in various regional versions of the Ramayana. There are many unmatching accounts of his birth, however all of them mentions him being born to a Makara (or Magara) after Hanuman took a dip into the ocean and his sweat drop fell into the mouth of the Makara, impregnating her. Makara begets Makardhwaja who was later raised by the Ahiravana, a demon king  who ruled Patala and a brother of Ravana. When Makardhwaja grew up, Ahiravana, seeing Makardhwaja's strength and virility, gave him job of guarding the gates of his kingdom.

Birth and thereafter
When Hanuman took a dip in the waters of the sea (after burning down the whole of Lanka with his inflamed tail), a drop of his sweat fell into the mouth of a mighty Makara. Out of this, Makardhwaja was born.

According to another, slightly different version, when Hanuman took a dip in the sea, to cool himself after burning Lanka; a drop of his sweat, due to the extreme heat generated in his body due to extreme labor by him, fell into the mouth of a giant fish-eat-reptile like creature, Makara, thus impregnating it.

The fish was caught by people of Ahiravana, who ruled Patala, the nether-world. Markardhwaja was discovered when the stomach of the fish was cut open and thus he was named after it and was brought up by them.

Story in The Ramayana
According to Ramayana told by Valmiki, this story has no place in it. However, in local folk tales this story is related. When Ahiravana took Rama and Lakshmana to Patala, Hanuman followed them to their rescue. He was challenged at the gate of Patala by a creature, who was part Vanara and part reptile - a Makara. He introduced himself Makaradhwaja and son of Hanuman, the mighty warrior.

Hanuman was amused and said that, I am myself the Hanuman but he could not be his son, as he was Brahmachari (a celibate) since birth. However, Hanuman then closed his eyes in dhyana to see the events described above of Makardhwaja's birth.

Makardhwaja asked him for his blessings, however, he said to Hanuman, that he will have to fight him to enter Patala, as he cannot betray Ahiravana, his mentor. Hanuman defeats Makaradhwaja in a duel and then ties him to the back to proceed further to ultimately kill Ahiravana and rescue Rama & Lakshamana as Makardhawaja is presented as the exemplary devotee (bhakta) of Ahiravana as Hanuman for Rama. While returning from patal lok Shri Ram takes a glance at Makradhwaj in pain, post enquiring Hanuman narrates the story to Shri Ram. Shri Ram being impressed by Makardhwajs stand for his mentor and fight with Hanuman declares him the king of Patal Lok as then king Ahiravan was killed.

Lineage
The Jethwa clan of Kshatriyas claim their descent from Makardhwaja. As per folk tales of their clan, Makardhwaja had a son named Mod-dhwaja and he had a son named Jethi-dhwaja. Jethwas claim descant from Jethi-dhwaja and worship Hanuman as their Iṣṭa-devatā. The Jethwa dynasty of Gujarat, who once ruled major part of Kathiawar and later the princely state of Porbandar, therefore, had the image of Hanuman on their royal flag.

Temples
Temples dedicated to Makardhwaja can be found in India, especially in Gujarat, where Jethwas once ruled. Some noted temples in Gujarat are at 
Odadar village near Porbandar.
 Hanuman-Dandi at Bet Dwarka, where idols of Makardhwaja and Hanuman are worshiped together. 
 Chinchawan, Tq. Wadwani Wadwani, Dist. Beed (Maharashtra)
 Karahiya near Gwalior, Madhya Pradesh
Balaji Makardhwaja Temple at Beawar, Rajasthan - which is dedicated to both father-son duo in form of Balaji Hanuman and Makardhwaja.

See also

Macchanu - son of Hanuman and Suvannamachha as per Southeast versions of Ramayana.

References

Vanara in the Ramayana
Characters in the Ramayana
Mythological human hybrids